Gacarage is a settlement in Kenya's Central Province.

Climate 
The climate of Central Province is generally cooler than that of the rest of Kenya, due to the region's higher altitude. Rainfall is fairly reliable, falling in two seasons, one from early March to May (the long rains) and a second during October and November (the short rains).

History 
The province is inhabited by the Kikuyu speaking community, who are part of the Kenya Eastern Bantu.  During Kenya's colonization by the British, much of the province was regarded as part of the 'White Highlands', for the exclusive use of the settler community. Therefore, it saw political activity from the local communities, who felt that they had an ancestral right to the land. This tension culminated in the 1950s with the Mau Mau rebellion; it saw the region placed under a state of emergency and the arrest of many prominent political leaders.

See also 
 Ruiru
 Gichuru

References 

Populated places in Central Province (Kenya)